Ceylan Yeğinsu is a Turkish-British journalist, who currently covers the United Kingdom for The New York Times.

Life
Yeğinsu began her journalism career in 2008 as a reporter and editor for Hurriyet Daily News, where she covered politics, culture, business and sport. She also ran a weekly column on issues of gender equality in Turkey. In 2011, she received a master's degree in Digital Media at the Columbia University Graduate School of Journalism and was awarded the Brigid O'Hara-Forster Fellowship. As a freelance reporter and multimedia journalist in New York and Istanbul, she worked for publications including The Atlantic, The Economist, Huffington Post, International Business Times.

In 2013, Yeğinsu joined the ' Istanbul Bureau. In September 2014, she ran a front-page story on ISIL's recruitment of Turks in the Hacıbayram neighborhood of Ankara. Her report was heavily criticized by President Recep Tayyip Erdoğan, who called the story "shameless, ignoble, treason." Yeğinsu was subsequently attacked by the newspaper Star'' and other pro-government media, and received multiple death threats, though the only problematic thing about her story was the ' editorial choice of a photo showing Erdoğan with then–Prime minister Ahmet Davutoglu leaving mosque in the neighborhood. The intimidation campaign against Yeğinsu forced her to temporarily leave the country. The directors of Reporters Without Borders, Article 19 and the English PEN to publish an open letter, reminding President Erdoğan of journalists significant role in a democracy and their protection in both Turkish and international law. The U.S. State Department criticized Turkey for these attempts of intimidation and threat.

References

Living people
Year of birth missing (living people)
Turkish women journalists
Turkish women's rights activists
Mass media freedom in Turkey
2015 controversies
Controversies in Turkey
Columbia University Graduate School of Journalism alumni
The New York Times writers